Grassau is a market town in the district of Traunstein in Bavaria in Germany. It is located south of lake Chiemsee in the valley of the Tiroler Ache.

Subdivisions
Grassau consists of the districts of:

 Grassau
 Mietenkam
 Rottau
 Aich
 Au
 Brandstätt
 Einöde
 Fahrnpoint
 Grafing
 Guxhausen
 Hindling
 Klaus
 Kucheln
 Mauthäusl
 Nachmühl
 Nußbaum
 Obermoosbach
 Reifing
 Reit
 Strehtrumpf
 Untermoosbach
 Viehhausen
 Weiher

References

Traunstein (district)